Errol Stewart may refer to:

 Errol Stewart (South African sportsman) (born 1969), former South African cricketer and rugby union player
 Errol Stewart (athlete) (born 1950), Jamaican former sprinter 
 Errol Stewart (bowls) (born 1931), Australian lawn bowler